Nirma is a former Pakistani Lollywood film actress and model. She started a career in modeling followed by television dramas.

Early life 
Nirma was born as Ayesha Jahangir in Kuwait, from where she completed her early education. After the death of her father, she along with her family moved to Lahore. Film producer Ejaz Durrani gave her the stage name Nirma.

Career
Nirma's first play was Ranjish and she appeared in the television serial Do Chand and Sarkar Sahab. Her debut film was Bazigar and she has appeared in films such as Laaj, Shararat, Qarz, and Behram Daku. In 1997, she played the role of a stage dancer in film Dream Girl which was directed by Sangeeta. Punjabi film credits include Babul Da Wera. Apart from movies, she has also regularly appeared in Punjabi stage dramas and various music videos.

Filmography

Films

Television 
 Laag (1998)
 Sarkar Sahab (2007)
 Lamhay''

See also 
 List of Lollywood actors

References

External links 
 

Pakistani film actresses
Pakistani female models
Living people
Actresses from Lahore
20th-century Pakistani actresses
21st-century Pakistani actresses
Year of birth missing (living people)
People from Lahore